North Fremantle railway station is a railway station on the Transperth network. It is located on the Fremantle line, 16.2 kilometres from Perth, serving the Fremantle suburb of North Fremantle.

History
The original North Fremantle station on the north side of Tydeman Street opened in 1881. In 1964, a new station halt opened in conjunction with a new Fremantle Railway Bridge with the original site redeveloped as a diesel locomotive depot.

On 28 July 1991 as part of the electrification of the line, a new station opened 800 metres to the north also replacing Leighton station that was a further 700 metres further north.

To the west of the station lies a freight line to the closed Leighton Marshalling Yard.

Services
North Fremantle station is served by Transperth Fremantle line services from Fremantle to Perth that continue through to Midland via the Midland line.

North Fremantle station saw 168,147 passengers in the 2013–14 financial year.

Platforms

Bus routes

References

External links

Fremantle line
Railway stations in Perth, Western Australia
Railway stations in Australia opened in 1991